The 1975 Columbia Lions football team was an American football team that represented Columbia University during the 1975 NCAA Division I football season. Columbia tied for second-to-last in the Ivy League. 

In their second season under head coach William Campbell, the Lions compiled a 2–7 record and were outscored 261 to 151. Mike Delaney and Mike Yeager were the team captains.  

The Lions' 2–5 conference record tied for sixth in the Ivy League standings. Columbia was outscored 210 to 144 by Ivy opponents. 

Columbia played its home games at Baker Field in Upper Manhattan, in New York City.

Schedule

References

Columbia
Columbia Lions football seasons
Columbia Lions football